Bath is an unincorporated community and census-designated place (CDP) in Clinton County in the U.S. state of Michigan. It is located in Bath Charter Township.  As of the 2010 census, the CDP had a population of 2,083.

History 
Bath was platted in 1864.

The community of Bath was listed as a newly-organized census-designated place for the 2010 census, meaning it now has officially defined boundaries and population statistics for the first time.

American supercentenarian Irene Dunham was born in Bath.

Bath School disaster

On May 18, 1927, in what became known as the Bath School disaster, Andrew Kehoe, a farmer and local school board member angry over losing an election for town clerk and under notice for foreclosure, killed his wife, detonated bombs in his house and farm buildings, and at the same time set off a bomb in the consolidated school. He drove to the school in a truck rigged with more explosives, which he detonated next to the school superintendent. In all, Kehoe killed 44 people, 38 of them children, and himself, in the worst school mass murder in U.S. history. Thirty-eight of the 314 students, three teachers, the superintendent, the postmaster, and a local farmer assisting at the scene were killed. Most of the dead were students from second to sixth grade. Fifty-eight others were injured.

Geography

Demographics

See also
 Bath Community Schools, which serves Bath and surrounding areas

References

Sources

Further reading 
  Online transcription of the first edition.

Bath Charter Township, Michigan
Unincorporated communities in Clinton County, Michigan
Unincorporated communities in Michigan
Census-designated places in Clinton County, Michigan
Census-designated places in Michigan
Populated places established in 1864
1864 establishments in Michigan